The 1991–92 Texas Longhorns men's basketball team represented The University of Texas at Austin in intercollegiate basketball competition during the 1991–92 season. The Longhorns were led by fourth-year head coach Tom Penders. The team finished the season with a 23–12 overall record and finished atop the standings in Southwest Conference play with a 11–3 conference record. Texas advanced to the NCAA tournament, falling to Iowa in the opening round.

Roster

Schedule and results

|-
!colspan=12 style=| Non-Conference Regular season

|-
!colspan=12 style=| SWC Regular season

|-
!colspan=12 style=| Southwest Conference tournament

|-
!colspan=12 style=| 1992 NCAA Tournament – East No. 8 seed

Rankings

References

Texas Longhorns men's basketball seasons
Texas
Texas
Texas Longhorns Basketball Team
Texas Longhorns Basketball Team